Michelle de Jong (born 6 July 1999) is a Dutch long track speed skater who specializes in the sprint distances.

Career
In February 2019, de Jong became junior world champion in the 1000 m event at the 2019 World Junior Championships in Baselga di Piné, Italy. She won the bronze medal in the 500 m event.

In 2019 she turned professional and became a member of Team Reggeborch.

Personal life
She is the younger sister of speed skater Antoinette de Jong.

Personal records

Tournament overview

Source:

References

External links
 Team Reggeborgh profile
 

1999 births
Living people
Dutch female speed skaters
Sportspeople from Heerenveen
Speed skaters at the 2022 Winter Olympics
Olympic speed skaters of the Netherlands
21st-century Dutch women